Timothy Layne Van Egmond (born May 31, 1969), is a former Major League Baseball pitcher who played with the Boston Red Sox (1994–1995) and Milwaukee Brewers (1996). He batted and threw right-handed.

A native of Shreveport, Louisiana, Van Egmond attended Jacksonville State University. He was selected in the 17th round of the 1991 amateur draft by the Boston Red Sox.

His first professional season, 1992, was arguably his best as a professional pitcher. Pitching for the Lynchburg Red Sox of the class A "Carolina League, Van Egmond posted a 12-4 record with a 3.41 ERA in 28 games, 27 of which were starts. He followed that with a 6-12 record and 3.98 ERA for the AA New Britain Red Sox of the Eastern League in 1993. He was assigned to the Pawtucket Red Sox, Boston's AAA affiliate in the International League, in 1994 and made 20 starts, going 9-5 with a 3.78 ERA in 119 innings.

Van Egmond made his MLB debut on June 26, 1994 against the Milwaukee Brewers. Van Egmond pitched 7⅔ innings in his first big league start, yielding five earned runs on five hits and four walks while striking out seven. The Brewers won the game 5-4, handing Van Egmond his first MLB loss. He recorded his first big league victory on July 29, 1994 at Fenway Park as the Red Sox defeated the Brewers 7-2. Van Egmond threw a complete game to earn the victory, yielding two runs on five hits and three walks, striking out four Milwaukee hitters.

The Red Sox released Van Egmond on June 6, 1996, and he signed with the Brewers as a free agent three days later. Having posted a 5-3 record with a 4.35 ERA with Pawtucket before being released, Van Egmond performed well for the Brewers' American Association affiliate New Orleans Zephyrs, going 5-1 with a 1.50 ERA in seven starts. His AAA performance in New Orleans earned him some time on the big league roster. He made 12 appearances with the Brewers, nine of which were starts. His final appearance at the big league level came September 25, 1996 in the first game of a double-header against the New York Yankees at Yankee Stadium. Taking the mound as the starting pitcher, the Yankees pounded Van Egmond for eight runs on four hits and four walks in 1⅓ innings of work en route to a 19-2 drubbing of the Brewers.

Van Egmond pitched in the minor leagues with Milwaukee affiliates but never again appeared in a big league uniform before retiring after going 0-6 with a 4.50 ERA in 11 appearances with the AA Huntsville Stars of the Southern League and Louisville RiverBats of the International League in 1999.

In a three-year MLB career, Van Egmond posted a 5-9 record with a 5.96 ERA in 99⅔ innings. In eight minor league season, he went 49-45 with a 3.81 ERA in 831 innings.

External links

Baseball almanac

Boston Red Sox players
Milwaukee Brewers players
Winter Haven Red Sox players
Major League Baseball pitchers
1969 births
Living people
Baseball players from Shreveport, Louisiana
Jacksonville State Gamecocks baseball players
Gulf Coast Red Sox players
Huntsville Stars players
Louisville Redbirds players
Lynchburg Red Sox players
New Britain Red Sox players
New Orleans Zephyrs players
Pawtucket Red Sox players
Tucson Toros players
Southern Union State Bison baseball players